"A Cowboy's Born with a Broken Heart" is a song written by Chris Farren and Jeffrey Steele, and recorded by American country music band Boy Howdy.  It was released in June 1993 as the second single from their album Welcome to Howdywood.  The song reached number 12 on the Billboard Hot Country Singles & Tracks chart in September 1993.

Content
The singer talks about how alone and pensive a cowboy is and has been since birth, implying that there is some mythical (if not genetic) and shared trait among cowboys that make them unique.  The song emphasizes a cowboys honesty and good character while also hinting at a typical anti-social tendency.

Chart performance

Music video
The music video was directed by Sara Nichols and produced by Tom Forrest.

References

Songs about cowboys and cowgirls
1993 singles
1992 songs
Boy Howdy songs
Curb Records singles
Songs written by Jeffrey Steele
Songs written by Chris Farren (country musician)
Song recordings produced by Chris Farren (country musician)